Metrópole da Amazônia (in English: Metropolis of the Amazon) is a conservation unit of the wildlife refuge type of integral protection (in Brazil abbreviated REVIS) created in 2010 (by State Decree 2 211), in the Metropolitan Region of Belém (State of Pará, Brazil),  from the capital of Belém.

The refuge is part of the AgroVárzea Project, having as main objectives: to contribute to the maintenance of natural ecological processes, through the protection of environments to ensure conditions for housing and reproduction of species of flora and fauna (part of the 31% of primary forest of the Metropolitan Region); develop productive techniques in the Forest Nursery of the communities. It features  of hiking and cycling trails.

References 

Protected areas of Pará
Belém
Protected areas established in 2010
2010 establishments in Brazil